Poblana letholepis, the La Preciosa silverside  is a species of neotropical silverside endemic to Mexico.

References 

Poblana
Endemic fish of Mexico
Freshwater fish of Mexico
Endangered fish
Fish described in 1950
Taxonomy articles created by Polbot
Oriental Basin